Omnifilm Entertainment is a Canadian television and film production company based in Vancouver, British Columbia.  Omnifilm produces content in a variety of genres including drama, factual, and lifestyle series and documentaries  for the Canadian and international markets. With sister companies Omnifilm Post and Omnifilm Releasing, Omnifilm is a vertically integrated content company that handles the development, production, post-production, and distribution of its content worldwide.

Productions

Comedy
 Fast Layne
 Gabby Duran & the Unsittables

Drama
 Alice I Think
 Arctic Air
 The Bletchley Circle: San Francisco
 Defying Gravity
 Dragon Boys
 Edgemont
 Primeval: New World
 Robson Arms
 The Odyssey
 This Space for Rent

Factual
 Ancient Clues: aka Mysteries of the Dead
 Beachcombers –True Stories
 Can't Stop Laughing
 CannaBiz
 Cantata For the King
 Champions of the Wild
 Creepy Crypts
 Dambusters FlyAgain
Dinosaur Cold Case
 Dolphin Dealer
 Firestorm, The Fire Suppression Paradox
 Greenpeace: Making a Stand
 Greenpeace:Voyages to Save the Whales
 Gwaii Haanas
 Hi-Tech Culture
 Ice Pilots NWT
 In a Sacred Way We Build
 Jade Fever
 Keepers of the Fire
 Killer Whales in the Wild
 Make Some Noise
 Mysteries of the River Giant
 Mystery of the Toxic Swans
 Mystics, Mechanics & Mind Bombs
 Older Women/Younger Men
 Pyros
 Running on a Dream:The Legacy of Terry Fox
 Shock/Wave
 Singing Our Stories
 Slammin’ Iron: Rebuilding the World
 Spidermania
 Stuntdawgs
 System Crash
 The Disappearance of the PX-15
 The Living Coast
 The Man Who Would be Moose
 Touch the Wilderness
 Trailblazers
 Visions of Carmanah
 Weird Sex and Snowshoes
Wild Bear Rescue
 Wild Horses of the Nemiah
 Within Reach
 Word Travels 
 Wrestling with Destiny: The Life and Times of Daniel Igali
Yukon's Wild Grizzlies

Lifestyle
 Healthy Home
 Namaste Yoga
 Namaste: The Five Elements
 Pure Design
 Quiet Mind
 Quiet Places
 She’s Crafty
 Shimmy
 Smart Cookies
Strong by NM

References

External links
 Official Website
 Omnifilm on IMDB

Television production companies of Canada
Film production companies of Canada
Companies based in Vancouver
1979 establishments in Canada
Companies established in 1979